Špindlerův Mlýn (formerly also Spindelmühle) is a town in Trutnov District in the Hradec Králové Region of the Czech Republic. It has about 1,000 inhabitants. It lies in the Giant Mountains and it is one of the most frequented ski resorts in the country.

Administrative parts
Villages of Bedřichov, Labská and Přední Labská are administrative parts of Špindlerův Mlýn.

Etymology
Špindlerův Mlýn, literally meaning "Špindler's Mill",  received its name after a mill belonging to the Špindler family, which was moved between the surrounding settlements Bedřichov, Labská and Svatý Petr in 1765. The municipality which did not exist at that time yet was given this name due to an official error. The locals wrote a request sent to the authorities here and signed it written in Špindler's Mill, but the authorities mistakenly thought that they were giving the name to a new municipality. After the merger of scattered settlements into one municipality, the name remained. One of the German variations of its name, Spindelmühle, was also created by an error of authorities.

Geography

It lies in the Giant Mountains. The town is situated a in the valley between the Medvědín mountain and the ridges of Kozí hřbety and Pláň.

Špindlerův Mlýn lies at the confluence of the river Elbe and the Dolský creek.

History

The area was covered by forests and not settled until the 16th century, when the first prospectors and then miners of silver and iron ore came. The miners and lumberjacks who came from Alps settled here and began to build huts. They took advantage of the experience from home and started raising cattle in the seemingly inhospitable mountains and farming in the clearings. The clearing became meadows and pastures, creating typical enclaves in the middle of forests, preserved to this day.

In the 18th century, large parts of the surrounding forests were a possession of the Habsburg minister Friedrich August von Harrach-Rohrau (1696–1749), after whom the village of Bedřichov (Friedrichsthal) is named. The Harrach family contributed to the improvement and development of the landscape. They founded several mountain huts all over the Giant Mountains.

After World War II, the remaining German-speaking population was expelled according to the Beneš decrees.

Tourism
After four travellers accommodated here in 1865, the locals recognized the tourist potential of this place, began to expand the huts and build hiking trails. The construction of the road from Vrchlabí in 1872 significantly contributed to the greater number of tourists. Poor buildings often became quality hotels. In 1909, operation of the electric lift for sledges, one of the first of its kind in Europe, started, which contributed to the reputation of the winter tourist resort.

With year-round use and with accommodation capacity of 10,000 beds, Špindlerův Mlýn is one of the most visited ski resorts in the country.

Demographics

Transport
In the Przełęcz Karkonoska mountain pass, there is a pedestrian border crossing.

Sport
During the winter season the area hosts the Europacup in freestyle skiing and SnowJam, a professional snowboarding event. Some years, e.g. 2019, the Alpine Ski World Cup has been held here. In the surroundings there are many marked hiking, mountain biking and cross-country skiing trails.

Wildwater canoeing is also common on the Elbe river. One of the most demanding natural tracks in Central Europe and the hardest in the Czech Republic is located here.

Sights

The main sights are the Church of Saints Peter and Paul from 1802 and reinforced concrete arch bridge from 1911.

Notable people
Anna K (born 1965), singer; raised here

Franz Kafka stayed here for recreation in 1922 and began writing of his famous work The Castle.

Twin towns – sister cities

Špindlerův Mlýn is twinned with:
 Alanya, Turkey
 Podgórzyn, Poland

References

External links

Official tourist portal

Cities and towns in the Czech Republic
Populated places in Trutnov District
Ski areas and resorts in the Czech Republic
Populated riverside places in the Czech Republic
Populated places on the Elbe